Saraphi is a tambon (subdistrict) of Saraphi District, in Chiang Mai Province, Thailand. In 2005 it had a population of 6,959 people. The tambon contains nine villages.

Etymology
Saraphi is the Thai name for a tree, Mammea siamensis.

References

Tambon of Chiang Mai province
Populated places in Chiang Mai province